20 Golden Greats is a 1977 compilation album by Diana Ross & the Supremes, released on the Motown label in the United Kingdom. The release spent seven weeks at number one on the UK Albums Chart, selling over 1,000,000 copies. Despite the album's title and that Ross & the Supremes had scored 21 UK chart hit singles, the compilation included two tracks that had never been hit singles in the UK: "My World Is Empty Without You" and "Love Is Like an Itching in My Heart", which were top 10 hits on the US Hot 100. All the other 18 tracks had made the UK singles chart. The three other hits scored by the group in partnership with The Temptations, were all excluded.

Motown expanded the track list to include hits from The Supremes after Ross left the trio in 1970, also including her solo work up to 1981, for the 1998 40 Golden Motown Greats CD. The same album artwork was used and this collection earned a gold disc for sales exceeding 100,000 copies.

Track listing

Side one
"Where Did Our Love Go" from Where Did Our Love Go
"Baby Love" from Where Did Our Love Go
"Come See About Me" from Where Did Our Love Go
"Stop! In the Name of Love" from More Hits by The Supremes
"Back in My Arms Again" from More Hits by The Supremes
"I Hear a Symphony" from I Hear a Symphony
"My World Is Empty Without You" from I Hear a Symphony
"Love Is Like an Itching in My Heart" from The Supremes A' Go-Go
"You Can't Hurry Love" from The Supremes A' Go-Go
"You Keep Me Hangin' On" from The Supremes Sing Holland-Dozier-Holland

Side two
"Love Is Here and Now You're Gone" from The Supremes Sing Holland-Dozier-Holland
"The Happening" from Greatest Hits
"Reflections" from Reflections
"In and Out of Love" from Reflections
"Forever Came Today" from Reflections
"Some Things You Never Get Used To" from Love Child
"Love Child" from Love Child
"I'm Livin' in Shame" from Let the Sunshine In
"No Matter What Sign You Are" from Let the Sunshine In
"Someday We'll Be Together" from Cream of the Crop

Personnel
Diana Ross: lead vocals
Mary Wilson: background vocals from "Where Did Our Love Go" through "In and Out of Love"
Florence Ballard: background vocals from "Where Did Our Love Go" through "In and Out of Love"
The Andantes (Jackie Hicks, Marlene Barrow and Louvain Demps): background vocals on "In and Out of Love" (shared with The Supremes), "Forever Came Today", "Love Child" and "I'm Livin' in Shame"
Maxine Waters and Julia Waters: background vocals on "Someday We'll Be Together"
Johnny Bristol: male vocal and background vocals on "Someday We'll Be Together"
Nickolas Ashford and Valerie Simpson: background vocals on "Some Things You Never Get Used To"
The Blackberries (Venetta Fields, Clydie King and Sherlie Matthews): background vocals on "No Matter What Sign You Are"

Credits
 Nick Ashford—Composer
 Jackey Beavers—Composer
 Johnny Bristol—Composer
 Henry Cosby—Composer
 Frank DeVol—Composer
 Lamont Dozier—Composer
 Harvey Fuqua—Composer
 Berry Gordy Jr.—Composer
 Brian Holland—Composer
 Eddie Holland—Composer
 Deke Richards—Composer
 Pam Sawyer—Composer
 Valerie Simpson—Composer
 The Supremes—Primary Artist
 R. Dean Taylor—Composer
 Frank Wilson—Composer

Chart history

Weekly charts

Year-end charts

Certifications

References

1977 greatest hits albums
20 Golden Greats
Motown compilation albums
Albums produced by Brian Holland
Albums produced by Lamont Dozier
Albums produced by Ashford & Simpson
Albums produced by Berry Gordy
Albums produced by Henry Cosby
Albums produced by Frank Wilson (musician)
Albums produced by Deke Wilson
Albums produced by R. Dean Taylor
Albums produced by Johnny Bristol